Najit is a Malakula language of Vanuatu, spoken by less than 5 speakers.

References

Sources

Malekula languages
Languages of Vanuatu